Sinoê Alves Avencurt (born 25 April 1984) is a Brazilian futsal player who plays as a pivot for Associação Campo Mourão Futsal and the Brazilian national futsal team.

References

External links
Liga Nacional de Futsal profile

1984 births
Living people
Brazilian men's futsal players
ADC Intelli players